Green Frontier is a Colombian crime thriller streaming television miniseries, created by Diego Ramírez Schrempp, Mauricio Leiva-Cock, and Jenny Ceballos, that premiered on Netflix on August 16, 2019. The series was directed by Ciro Guerra, Jacques Toulemonde Vidal and Laura Mora Ortega and stars Juana del Río, Nelson Camayo, Ángela Cano, Miguel Dionisio Ramos, Bruno Clairefond, Andrés Crespo, Marcela Mar, Mónica Lopera, Andrés Castañeda, John Narváez, Edwin Morales, Karla López and Antonio Bolívar. It was written by Mauricio Leiva-Cock, Gibran Portela, Camila Brugés, Natalia Santa, Javier Peñalosa, Maria Camila Arias, Anton Goenechea and Nicolás Serrano.

Synopsis
Green Frontier follows the story of a "young detective and her partner who travel deep into the Amazon, on the border of Brazil and Colombia, to investigate a series of bizarre murders. They soon realize that there’s more intrigue to the jungle than the homicides, as they come across a mysterious indigenous tribe with an extraordinary secret that they will go to great lengths to protect."

Cast and characters

Main
 Juana del Río as Helena Poveda
 Nelson Camayo as Reynaldo Bueno
 Ángela Cano as Ushe
 Miguel Dionisio Ramos as Yua
 Bruno Clairefond as Joseph Schultz
 Andrés Crespo as Efrain Márquez
 Marcela Mar as Hermana Raquel
 Mónica Lopera as Aura
 Andrés Castañeda as Iván Uribe
 John Narváez as Cayetano
 Edwin Morales
 Karla López as Hermana Esther
 Antonio Bolívar as Wilson Nai

Recurring
 Gabriella Campagna as Hermana Sonia

Episodes

Production

Development
On November 22, 2017, it was announced that Netflix had given the production a series order for a first season consisting of eight episodes. The series is created by Diego Ramírez Schrempp, Mauricio Leiva-Cock and Jenny Ceballos and executive produced by Schrempp, Ciro Guerra, Andrés Calderón, Jorge Dorado and Cristian Conti. Green Frontier is based on an original idea from Diego Ramírez Schrempp and Jenny Ceballos of Dynamo. The series was directed by Ciro Guerra, Laura Mora Ortega and Jacques Toulemonde Vidal and written by Mauricio Leiva-Cock, Antón Goenechea, Camila Brugrés, Gibrán Portela, Javier Peñalosa, María Camila Arias, Natalia Santa and Nicolás Serrano. Production companies involved with the series were slated to consist of Dynamo Producciones.

Casting

Sometime after the series was ordered by Netflix, it was confirmed that Juana del Río, Nelson Camayo and Ángela Cano would star in the series.

Filming
Principal photography for the first season took place on location in Leticia, Amazonas, Colombia in 2018.

Release
On July 29, 2019, the official teaser for the miniseries was released. On August 5, 2019, the official trailer for the miniseries was released by Netflix.

Reception

Critical response
The review aggregator website Rotten Tomatoes reported a 100% approval rating for the first season with an average rating of 7.5/10, based on 5 reviews.

Notes

References

External links
 
 

Spanish-language Netflix original programming
Colombian television series
2019 Colombian television series debuts
2010s crime drama television series
Thriller television series
Serial drama television series
Fiction about human sacrifice
Dark fantasy television series
Television about magic
Television shows set in Colombia
Television shows set in Amazonas (Brazilian state)
Colombian drama television series
Murder in television